Victoria Holmes is an English author. She is better known by the name Erin Hunter, a pseudonym under which she and others write the New York Times Bestselling Warriors series.

Biography

Victoria Holmes was born in Berkshire, London  She learned to ride horses at the age of two. She loved horses, and wrote many books about them. As a child she enjoyed reading and writing stories of her own when she had the time. She studied English at the University of Oxford, where the ancient buildings and sense of tradition inspired an interest in history in her. She currently works in London as a children's book editor and escapes to the English countryside whenever she can, where she rides horses and walks her dog, Missy.

Books

Together with several others, Holmes has worked on Warriors, Seekers, Survivors and Bravelands, all published by HarperCollins, under the pen name Erin Hunter. Holmes creates the plots for the stories, then the other authors do the writing itself, often alternating between one another. Holmes is also in charge of maintaining series continuity and making sure that a consistent "voice" is maintained across the books.

Holmes is also the author of the Epic Horse series of novels: Rider in the Dark (2004), The Horse from the Sea (2005), and Heart of Fire (2006).

Currently Holmes is the co-author of the Hope Meadows series (Animal Ark Revisited) alongside veterinary surgeon Sarah McGurk. The series is published by Hodder in the UK.

Holmes stepped back from her involvement in the Warriors series after a diagnosis of cancer in 2017.

References

External links
 
 
 Erin Hunter (shared pseudonym) at LC Authorities, with 79 records

Warriors (novel series)
English children's writers
English women novelists
21st-century English women writers
Living people
Year of birth missing (living people)
21st-century English novelists
British women children's writers